Scott Williams was an American football coach.  He served as the first head football coach at the University of Illinois at Urbana–Champaign, coaching for one season in 1890 and compiling a record of 1–2.

Head coaching record

References

Year of birth missing
Year of death missing
American football quarterbacks
Player-coaches
Illinois Fighting Illini football coaches
Illinois Fighting Illini football players